North Korea participated in the 2010 Summer Youth Olympics in Singapore.

Medalists

Athletics

Girls
Track and Road Events

Diving

Boys

Girls

Judo

Individual

Team

Swimming

Table tennis
Table tennis at the 2010 Youth Summer Olympics

Individual

Team

Weightlifting

References

External links
Competitors List: North Korea

2010 in North Korean sport
Nations at the 2010 Summer Youth Olympics
North Korea at the Youth Olympics